Archiminolia katoi is a species of sea snail, a marine gastropod mollusk in the family Solariellidae.

Description
The size of the shell varies between 5 mm and 15 mm.

Distribution
This marine species occurs off Japan, the Philippines and New Caledonia.

References

 Museum of New Zealand: Archiminolia katoi 
 Habe, T (1964), Shells of the Western Pacific in Colour, Vol.II, 233pp., 66pls., Hoikusha Publishing Company, Osaka
 Higo, S., Callomon, P. & Goto, Y. (1999) Catalogue and Bibliography of the Marine Shell-Bearing Mollusca of Japan. Elle Scientific Publications, Yao, Japan, 749 pp.
 Vilvens, C.; Williams, S. T. (2016). New genus and new species of Solariellidae (Gastropoda: Trochoidea) from New Caledonia, Fiji, Vanuatu, Solomon Islands, Philippines, Papua New Guinea and French Polynesia. in: Héros, V. et al. (Ed.) Tropical Deep-Sea Benthos 29. Mémoires du Muséum national d'Histoire naturelle (1993). 208: 267-289

External links
 

katoi
Gastropods described in 1961